The 2012 Brasileiro de Marcas season was the second season of the Brasileiro de Marcas. It begin on April 22 at the Interlagos and ended on December 2 at the Curitiba, after sixteen races. Several changes occurred in the championship. Mitsubishi entered with the 2012 version of Mitisubishi Lancer GT, Honda changed to the ninth generation Honda Civic, Chevrolet used Chevrolet Cruze which replaced the Chevrolet Astra, and Toyota became an official manufacturer on the championship with Toyota Corolla XRS.

Honda driver Ricardo Mauricio won the championship. He did not win any races, but finished on the podium at ten of sixteen. Toyota won the manufacturers' championship.

Teams and drivers
All drivers were registered in Brazilian.

Race calendar and results
The provisional calendar was announced by the championship organisers on 20 November 2011, with Curitiba to host two races, include a support at the FIA WTCC Race of Brazil. On 25 May 2012, the race at Rio de Janeiro was moved to August. All races were held in Brazil.

Championship standings
Points were awarded as follows:

Drivers' Championship

Notes:
† — Driver not racing, but scored points to participate with partner.

Manufacturers' Championship

Teams' Championship

References

External links
 

Marcas
Brasileiro de Marcas seasons